Mang Lon, Manglon, Manglun, Manglön, or Mang Lön a state in the northern Shan states of Myanmar, was formerly the chief state of the Wa people. It is a mountainous territory, including the valleys of the Salween and its tributary the Nam Hka. It had an approximate area of 7770 km² and its estimated population in 1911 was 40,000.

Mang Lon state extended from about 21° 30′ to 23° N., or for 100 miles, along the river Salween, which divided the state into East and West Mang Lon. The inhabitants of East Manglon were Was, while West Manglon was mostly inhabited by Shan people.

History
Nothing is known about the history of Manglon before the nineteenth century. The area had been a kingdom named Jambularattha according to legend.

The first Sawbwa of Manglon was Ta Ang, a Wa leader who became tributary to Hsenwi State in 1814, retaining his hold over the territory. The eastern part of the state was often raided by Wa chiefs of the neighbouring independent Wa States. 
The capital, Takut, was located NE of Pangyang and was perched on a hilltop 6000 feet above sea level. The Sawbwa was a Wa who adopted the style of the Shan rulers. He had control over two substates, Mot Hai to the north and Maw Hpa to the south. The Wa of Mang Lon had given up headhunting, and many professed Buddhism.

Traditionally the adjacent Wa States had been administered by a Sawbwa, a Shan hereditary chief who resided in Mang Lon. In the second half of the 19th century the British authorities in Burma judged the Wa territory remote and of difficult access and, excepting Mang Lon, they left the Wa States without administration, its border with China undefined. That situation suited the Wa well, for throughout their history they had consistently preferred being left alone.

There were few Wa in West Mang Lon, where Shans formed the chief population, but there were Palaungs, Chinese and Yanglam, besides Lahu. The bulk of the population in East Mang Lon was Wa, but there were Shans in the valley areas. Both portions were very hilly; the only flat land being along the banks of streams in the valleys, and here the Shans were settled. There were prosperous settlements and bazaars at Nawng Hkam and Mong Kao in West Mang Lon.

Rulers
The rulers of Manglon bore the title of Saopha. Between 1870 and 1892 the state was divided into East and West Manglön.

Saophas 
1814 - 1822                Hsö Hkam (Ta Awng)                 (d. 1822)
1822 - 1852                Sao Hkun Sang (Khun Sing)          (d. 1852)
1852 - 1853                Uyaraza (Upayaza)                  (d. 1854)
1853 - 1860                Naw Hpa (Nawpha)                   (d. 1860)
1860 - 1919                Sao Tön Hsang (Tun Sang)           (b. 1831 - d. 1919) (1870-1892, in East Manglön)
1870 - 1877                Hsang Kyaw (in West Manglön)
1877 - 1892                Sao Maha (in West Manglön)
1919 - 1952                Sao Man Laik 
1919 - 1946                Sao Hka Nan -Regent                (b. 1892 - d. 1946)

See also
List of rulers of Shan states
Wa people
Wa State

References

Wa people
Shan States